The Moldenhauer Archives at the Library of Congress is a collection of original music, unique documents and manuscripts within the Library of Congress, the national library of the United States. The Moldenhauer archives contains many thousands of unique original documents of historical significance. Part of the collection was bequeathed to The Moldenhauer Archives at Harvard University, located in the Houghton Library at Harvard University.

Significance 
The archives were founded through a donation of documents and funds by the German collector, historian and musicologist Hans Moldenhauer, in honour of his wife Rosaleen Moldenhauer.

The original bequest, consisting of over 3,500 documents, constituted the most comprehensive collection of original musical manuscripts ever accumulated. The collection spans musical periods from the Middle Ages through the 20th century, and includes original musical manuscripts by 57 of the foremost western composers, from Bach, Bartók, Beethoven and Brahms, via Mahler, Mendelssohn and Mozart, to Schubert, Schoenberg and Webern.

Since 1987, the Moldenhauer Archives have grown to many thousands of items that are now housed in nine institutions around the world: 
in the United States, at the Library of Congress, Harvard University, Northwestern University, Washington State University, and Whitworth College; in Basel, Switzerland, at the Paul Sacher Foundation; in Zürich, Switzerland, at the Zentralbibliothek; in Munich, Germany, at the Bayerische Staatsbibliothek; and in Vienna, Austria, at the Stadtarchiv und Oesterreichische Nationalbibliothek.

About the benefactor 

Hans Moldenhauer was born in 1906 in Germany, but emigrated to the United States in 1938 to escape fascism in his native country. He lived and worked in the United States until his death in 1987.

Literature 
 John Y. Cole: Encyclopedia of The Library of Congress. Washington, D.C. 2004. 
 Jon Newsom, Alfred Mann: The Rosaleen Moldenhauer Memorial: Music History from Primary Sources : a Guide to the Moldenhauer Archives. Washington, D.C. 2000, Library of Congress.

External links 
 Online collection at Library of Congress: The Moldenhauer Archives - The Rosaleen Moldenhauer Memorial
 Finding aid to the Moldenhauer archives at the Library of Congress, circa 1000-circa 1990
 Article: The Rosaleen Moldenhauer Memorial at the Library of Congress (English)
 www.loc.gov: Website Library of Congress (English)
 Online-Katalog (English)
 Library of Congress Authorities (English)
 Moldenhauer Archives at Harvard University

References
 

Library of Congress
Music archives in the United States